Mihir Kanti Chaudhuri (born 1947) is an Indian inorganic chemist and a former vice chancellor of Tezpur University. He is known for his studies on the synthesis of dioxygen complexes and fluorine compounds of metals and non metals and is an elected fellow of the Indian National Science Academy, and the Indian Academy of Sciences. The Council of Scientific and Industrial Research, the apex agency of the Government of India for scientific research, awarded him the Shanti Swarup Bhatnagar Prize for Science and Technology, one of the highest Indian science awards, in 1989, for his contributions to chemical sciences.

Biography 

M. K. Chaudhuri, born on 21 July 1947 in the northeast Indian state of Assam, obtained a master's degree from Kalyani University before securing his PhD from the Indian Institute of Technology, Kharagpur in 1973. Moving to Germany, he completed Dr rer. net. from Ruhr University Bochum in 1975 and returned to India to join the North Eastern Hill University as a professor at the department of chemistry. Later, he moved to the Indian Institute of Technology, Guwahati as the head of the chemistry department where he served as the dean of student affairs as well as the dean of research and development. In May 2007, he was appointed as the vice chancellor of Tezpur University. On completion of his five-year term, he was reappointed as the vice chancellor in 2012 and held the position until May, 2017.

Chaudhuri's researches have been focused on the synthesis of dioxygen complexes and fluorine compounds of metals and non-metals. He has published a number of articles in peer-reviewed journals and Indian Academy of Sciences have listed 88 of them in their online repository. Under his leadership, Tezpur University have developed into a major centre of learning in India and received the Visitor's Award for the Best University from the President of India in 2016. He has been associated with the Department of Science and Technology, Council of Scientific and Industrial Research and the University Grants Commission of India as well as the state and union government bodies as an expert committee member and has organized many refresher courses and seminars at the university and outside. He was also a member of the Indo-US Higher Education Dialogue of 2014 and the Inspire program on Mathematics of the Department of Science and Technology.

Awards and honors 
The Indian Academy of Sciences elected him as their fellow in 1988 and the Council of Scientific and Industrial Research awarded him the Shanti Swarup Bhatnagar Prize, one of the highest Indian science awards, in 1989. He became an elected fellow of the Indian National Science Academy in 1991 and received P. Natrajan Endowment Award in 1998. He is also a recipient of the Chemito Award (2002) and S. S. Sandhu Award of Indian Chemical Society (2005). In 2017 he received honorary D.Sc degree from Kalyani University and University of Science and Technology, Meghalaya.

Selected bibliography

See also 
 Dioxygen

Notes

References

External links

Further reading 
 

Recipients of the Shanti Swarup Bhatnagar Award in Chemical Science
1947 births
Indian scientific authors
Scientists from Assam
Fellows of the Indian Academy of Sciences
Fellows of the Indian National Science Academy
IIT Kharagpur alumni
Academic staff of the Indian Institute of Technology Guwahati
Ruhr University Bochum alumni
Heads of universities and colleges in India
Tezpur University
20th-century Indian chemists
Indian inorganic chemists
Living people
University of Kalyani alumni
Academic staff of the North-Eastern Hill University